During the 2018–19 season, Real Valladolid participated in the La Liga and Copa del Rey.

Players
.

Reserve team

Out on loan

Transfers

In

Out

Competitions

Overview

La Liga

League table

Results summary

Results by round

Matches

Copa del Rey

Round of 32

Round of 16

Squad statistics

Appearances and goals

|-
! colspan=14 style=background:#dcdcdc; text-align:center|Goalkeepers

|-
! colspan=14 style=background:#dcdcdc; text-align:center|Defenders

|-
! colspan=14 style=background:#dcdcdc; text-align:center|Midfielders

|-
! colspan=14 style=background:#dcdcdc; text-align:center|Forwards

|-
! colspan=14 style=background:#dcdcdc; text-align:center| Players who have made an appearance or had a squad number this season but have left the club

|-
|}

Goal scorers

Disciplinary record

References

Real Valladolid seasons
Valladolid